"Peaches N Cream" is a song by American hip hop recording artist Snoop Dogg, featuring vocals from American singer Charlie Wilson. was released on March 10, 2015, as the first single of his thirteenth studio album Bush, with the record labels I Am Other and Columbia Records. The song was produced by Pharrell Williams, who also participated in the band composition, along with the interpreters and Nelly, Garry Shider, George Clinton, James Brown, Robert Ginyard, Jr., Mary Brockert, and Walter Morrison.

Composition 
"Peaches N Cream" is a hip hop, mid-tempo song that features beats and minor influences of funk. The song itself contains a sample of "It Takes Two" by Rob Base and DJ E-Z Rock from their album It Takes Two, "One Nation Under a Groove" by George Clinton group Funkadelic from their album One Nation Under a Groove and "I Need Your Lovin'" by Teena Marie from her album Irons in the Fire.

Music video 
On March 9, 2015, Snoop's uploaded the music video for "Peaches N Cream" on his YouTube and Vevo account. The lyric video directed by Wolf & Crow. The music video was released on March 18, 2015. The music video was directed by Aramis Israel and Hannah Lux Davis. The video is exactly four minutes and twenty seconds long, a reference to cannabis.

Commercial performance
"Peaches N Cream" is his highest-charting single from Bush. The song debuted at number-one on the United States Billboard Twitter Top Tracks chart dated March 28, 2015 and debuted at number 16 Bubbling Under Hot 100 Singles. Internationally the song peaking at number three in Belgium (Wallonia). In the United Kingdom, the song debuted and peaked at number 58 on the UK Singles Chart. In the Australia "Peaches N Cream" debuted and peaked at number 93 on the ARIA Singles chart.

Live performances 
The song was the performed for the public for the first time in Los Angeles, on February 5, 2015, during a Pre-Grammy party. Kendrick Lamar, Warren G, Too $hort, Chaka Khan and Miguel were in attendance. Snoop Dogg performing his song during his guest starring performance in Fox's Empire episode "Die But Once". On March 29, 2015, Snoop performed it for the song along with Charlie Wilson during the iHeartRadio Music Awards 2015.

Track listing 
 Download digital
 Peaches N Cream (featuring Charlie Wilson) — 4:44
 CD single (Sweden)
 Peaches N Cream  (Radio Edit) — 4:09

Charts

Weekly charts

Release history

References

2015 singles
2015 songs
Snoop Dogg songs
Charlie Wilson (singer) songs
Pharrell Williams songs
Songs written by Snoop Dogg
Songs written by Pharrell Williams
Song recordings produced by Pharrell Williams
Columbia Records singles
Songs written by Nelly
Songs written by George Clinton (funk musician)
Songs written by Garry Shider
Music videos directed by Hannah Lux Davis